Government House is the official residence of the Administrator of Norfolk Island, located on the Australian external territory of Norfolk Island. It was built in 1829 and, as part of the Kingston and Arthurs Vale Historic Area, is listed on the Australian National Heritage List and as a UNESCO World Heritage site.

References

External links 

1829 establishments in Australia
Buildings and structures completed in 1829
Official residences in Australia
Buildings and structures in Norfolk Island
Government Houses of Australia
Kingston, Norfolk Island